Muzyka Emocjonalna is the first EP and seventh album overall by Polish rapper Pezet, a member of Płomień 81. The EP was only sold on the official website of the project, with only 5,000 copies made available.

Track list

Polish-language albums
2009 EPs